Eucalyptus beaniana , commonly known as the Bean's ironbark, is a small tree that is endemic to Queensland. It has rough, furrowed "ironbark" on the trunk and branches, dull green to bluish, lance-shaped to curved adult leaves, flower buds in groups of seven, white flowers and cup-shaped to conical fruit. It is only known from four locations in southern inland Queensland.

Description
It has hard black "ironbark" on its trunk and larger branches. Branches thinner than about  have smooth, brownish white bark. The flower buds are arranged in group of seven, mostly on the ends of the branches. The operculum is about as long as, or slightly shorter than the floral cup and blunt conical to rounded. Flowering has been recorded in September and the flowers are white.

Eucalyptus beaniana is closely related to E. taurina, but can be distinguished by the linear juvenile leaves and by larger amount of smooth bark on the branches.

Taxonomy and naming
Eucalyptus beaniana was first formally described by Ken Hill and Lawrie Johnson in 1991 in the journal Telopea from samples collected near the Isla Gorge lookout carpark by Johnson and Anthony Russell Bean in 1984. The specific epithet (beaniana) honours Anthony Bean.

Distribution and habitat
Bean's ironbark is found growing in shallow and sandy soils as part of woodland communities along with numerous other eucalypt species, on quartzose and sandstone ridges. It is known from only four locations in south-east Queensland, in the Isla Gorge National Park, near Taroom, Cracow and Mundubbera.

Conservation
Eucalyptus beaniana is listed as "vulnerable" under the Australian Government Environment Protection and Biodiversity Conservation Act 1999 and under the Queensland Government Nature Conservation Act 1992.

See also
List of Eucalyptus species

References

Trees of Australia
beaniana
Myrtales of Australia
Flora of Queensland